The 2019 King Cup, or The Custodian of the Two Holy Mosques Cup, was the 44th edition of the King Cup since its establishment in 1957, and the 1st under the current format. It started on 1 January and concluded with the final on 2 May 2019. As winners of the tournament, Al-Taawoun qualified for the 2020 AFC Champions League group stage.

Al-Taawoun won their first title after a 2–1 win over defending champions Al-Ittihad in the final on 2 May 2019.

Format changes
On 9 February 2018, the Saudi FF announced that the number of teams were increased from 32 to 64 teams to accommodate the increased number of teams in the leagues. All Pro League, MS League, and Second Division teams will compete in the tournament under the new format as well as the four winners from the Third Division playoffs.

Participating teams
A total of 64 teams participated in this season. 16 teams from the Pro league, 20 teams from the MS League, 24 teams from the Second Division and 4 teams qualifying from the preliminary stage.

Bracket

Note:     H: Home team, A: Away team

Source: SAFF

Round of 64
The Round of 64 matches were played between 1 and 5 January 2019. All times are local, AST (UTC+3).

Round of 32
The Round of 32 matches were played between 14 and 18 January 2019. All times are local, AST (UTC+3).

Round of 16
The Round of 16 matches were played between 21 and 23 January 2019. All times are local, AST (UTC+3).

Quarter-finals
The Quarter-finals were played on 1 and 2 April 2019. All times are local, AST (UTC+3).

Semi-finals
The Semi-finals were played on 26 and 27 April 2019. All times are local, AST (UTC+3).

Final

The final was played on 2 May 2019 at the King Fahd International Stadium in Riyadh. All times are local, AST (UTC+3).

Top goalscorers
As of 2 May 2019

Note: Players and teams marked in bold are still active in the competition.

References

External links
Custodian of the Two Holy Mosques Cup - Saudi Arabia 2019, Goalzz.com

2019
King Cup
Saudi Arabia